Charles James Bean (born August 10, 1970) is an American filmmaker, animator, storyboard artist, and voice actor, known for directing The Lego Ninjago Movie with Paul Fisher and Bob Logan and his work on Tron: Uprising as a director and executive producer. He also worked as a storyboard artist on Dexter's Laboratory, Samurai Jack, The Powerpuff Girls, I Am Weasel, and Cow and Chicken, as well as a director and storyboard supervisor on Robotboy. He co-created two pilots for Cartoon Network, one with Don Shank and Carey Yost and one with Chris Reccardi, which were respectively entitled Buy One, Get One Free and IMP, Inc. Bean was also a layout artist on The Ren and Stimpy Show, Animaniacs, and Batman: The Animated Series.

Filmography

Film

Television

References

External links

1970 births
Living people
Animators from California
Artists from Los Angeles
American animated film directors
American animated film producers
American storyboard artists
American television directors
Television producers from California
Cartoon Network Studios people
Nickelodeon Animation Studio people
American television writers
American male television writers
Prop designers
21st-century American screenwriters
21st-century American male writers